Buddy Whittington (born December 28, 1956, in Fort Worth, Texas), is an American guitarist. He began playing the guitar inspired by his sister's records of The Beatles, The Rolling Stones, and John Mayall's Bluesbreakers with Eric Clapton. At the age of 14 he was already a part of the Dallas/Fort Worth music scene and playing regularly in the clubs along Jacksboro Highway. While attending L.D. Bell High School, Whittington played in a band called Short Change, which opened for Point Blank, a band that he would later join, replacing guitar player Kim Davis. During the early 1980s, he formed and sang with his own band, The Sidemen. In 1991, they opened for John Mayall and when Coco Montoya left the Bluesbreakers in 1993, Mayall called him to take his place in the band. In Mayall's band Whittington sang occasionally and contributed to songwriting. When, after fifteen years, Mayall disbanded the Bluesbreakers, Whittington continued to gig in Texas, but also joined forces with Roger Cotton and Pete Stroud, who had toured with Mayall as part of Peter Green's band.

In 2008, Whittington released his first solo album and he continues to tour regularly in the UK and throughout Europe, though Roger Cotton has left the band, which now works as a threesome featuring Darby Todd on drums. In August 2013, Whittington sat in with his old boss John Mayall at the Bedford Blues Festival in Bedford, Texas. Whittington lives in Hurst, Texas with his family.

Whittington usually plays a 1963 Stratocaster plugged into a Dr. Z amplifier. He also plays a Lentz guitar modeled partially after the Fender Telecaster.

Discography
 1980 – Texas Boogie Blues (Ray Sharpe)
 1995 – Spinning Coin (John Mayall & the Bluesbreakers)
 1997 – Blues for the Lost Days (John Mayall & the Bluesbreakers)
 1999 – Padlock on the Blues (John Mayall & the Bluesbreakers)
 2001 – Along for The Ride (John Mayall & the Bluesbreakers)
 2002 – Stories (John Mayall & the Bluesbreakers)
 2003 – 70th Birthday Concert (John Mayall & the Bluesbreakers)
 2005 – Road Dogs (John Mayall & the Bluesbreakers)
 2007 – In the Palace of the King (John Mayall & the Bluesbreakers)
 2007 – Buddy Whittington (Buddy Whittington Band)
 2007 – Texas Blues Project, Vol. 1 (Dr. Wu and Friends)
 2010 – Bag Full of Blues (Buddy Whittington Band)
 2010 – Texas Blues Project, Vol. 2 (Dr. Wu and Friends)
 2011 – Six String Svengali (Buddy Whittington Band)

References

External links
 Buddy Whittington on Myspace
 Official Buddy Whittington website

1956 births
John Mayall & the Bluesbreakers members
Living people
Guitarists from Texas
American male guitarists
People from Fort Worth, Texas
20th-century American guitarists
21st-century American guitarists